Liesel Schumann (née Sireni; 10 August 1907 – 1967) was a German athlete who mainly competed in javelin throw. She won this event at the 1930 Women's World Games, setting an unofficial world record. Domestically she held the German title in 1933 and placed second in 1930–1932.

References

German female javelin throwers
1907 births
1967 deaths
Women's World Games medalists